Evangelos Kouvelis (born 1917) was a Greek cyclist. He competed in the individual and team road race events at the 1948 Summer Olympics.

References

External links
 

1917 births
Possibly living people
Greek male cyclists
Olympic cyclists of Greece
Cyclists at the 1948 Summer Olympics
Place of birth missing